Rand Morrison (born June 22, 1949) is the winner of 10 Emmy Awards, two George Foster Peabody Awards and a duPont award. He has been executive producer of "CBS News Sunday Morning" since September 1999.

Background
Morrison was born in Cleveland, Ohio on June 22, 1949. He started his career with the Associated Press and United Press International from 1977-1982. In 1982 he joined CBS News as a writer for "Nightwatch."

Education
Morrison graduated from Ohio State University with a BA in English and from Northwestern University with a master's degree in journalism.

Career
Morrison has been the executive producer of the "CBS News Sunday Morning" show since September 1999. The show averaged 6.1 million viewers during the first quarter of 2014 and it won a Daytime Emmy in 2014. Before his work with "CBS Sunday Morning" he was the executive producer of CBS News Productions from 1998-1999. He produced the 13-part "Century of Country" series about the history of country music for The Nashville Network. Prior to this, he was in senior management for several CBS News magazines. He was the senior broadcast producer for "Public Eye with Bryant Gumbel" from 1997-1998 and for "48 Hours" from 1996-1997. From 1993-1996 he was a senior producer for "Eye to Eye with Connie Chung."

References

Living people
1949 births
Ohio State University College of Arts and Sciences alumni
Medill School of Journalism alumni
American television producers